There have been three baronetcies created for persons with the surname Kinloch, two in the Baronetage of Nova Scotia and one in the Baronetage of the United Kingdom. Two of the creations are extant as of 2010.

The Kinloch Baronetcy, of Kinloch in the County of Perth, was created in the Baronetage of Nova Scotia on 5 September 1685 for David Kinloch. The second Baronet, James Kinloch (died 1744), married Elizabeth Nevay. The third Baronet, Sir James Kinloch (Nevay), who married Janet Duff, took part in the Jacobite Rising of 1745. He was captured, tried, and condemned to death and the baronetcy and lands were forfeited. However, he was later pardoned on the condition that he remained in England and never to return to Scotland (he settled in Barnstaple). Due to ill health he was granted permission to return to Scotland for his last years. He died in 1766. Although the baronetcy was never restored, their lands were and his son, William Kinloch (born ), sold the Kinloch estate to his cousin George Oliphant Kinloch, grandson of James Kinloch, younger brother of the first Baronet.

George's son and namesake, George Kinloch, a politician, had to flee to France in 1819 after advocating reform. He later returned to Britain and became the first representative for Dundee in the House of Commons in 1832. His son was the first Baronet of the 1873 creation (see below).

The Kinloch Baronetcy, of Gilmerton in the County of Haddington, was created in the Baronetage of Nova Scotia on 16 September 1686 for Francis Kinloch, Lord Provost of Edinburgh. His eldest son and successor, Sir Francis Kinloch, 2nd Baronet, married Mary, second daughter of General David Leslie, Lord Newark. The eleventh Baronet was a Brigadier-General in the British Army and served in the Second Boer War and the First World War.

The family seat is Gilmerton House, North Berwick, East Lothian.

The Kinloch Baronetcy, of Kinloch in the County of Perth, was created in the Baronetage of the United Kingdom on 16 April 1873 for George Kinloch. He was the son of George Kinloch (see the 1685 creation above for earlier history of the family). The second Baronet sat as Member of Parliament for Perthshire East.

Kinloch baronets, of Kinloch (1685)
Sir David Kinloch, 1st Baronet (died )
Sir James Kinloch, 2nd Baronet (–1744)
Sir James Kinloch, 3rd Baronet (died 1766)

Kinloch baronets, of Gilmerton (1686)

Sir Francis Kinloch, 1st Baronet (died 1691)
Sir Francis Kinloch, 2nd Baronet (died 1699)
Sir Francis Kinloch, 3rd Baronet (1676–1747)
Sir James Kinloch, 4th Baronet (1705–1778)
Sir David Kinloch, 5th Baronet (–1795)
Sir Francis Kinloch, 6th Baronet (–1795) (murdered by the below)
Sir Archibald Gordon Kinloch, 7th Baronet (died under house arrest in 1800 for the murder of the above in 1795 in Gilmerton House)
Sir Alexander Kinloch, 8th Baronet (died 1813)
Sir David Kinloch, 9th Baronet (1805–1879)
Sir Alexander Kinloch, 10th Baronet (1830–1912)
Brigadier Sir David Alexander Kinloch, 11th Baronet CB, MVO (1856–1944)
Sir Alexander Davenport Kinloch, 12th Baronet (1902–1982)
Sir David Kinloch, 13th Baronet (born 1951)

The heir apparent is the present holder's son Alexander Kinloch, Younger of Gilmerton (b. 1978).

Kinloch baronets, of Kinloch (1873)
Sir George Kinloch, 1st Baronet (1800–1881)
Sir John George Smyth Kinloch, 2nd Baronet (1849–1910)
Sir George Kinloch, 3rd Baronet OBE (1880–1948)
Sir John Kinloch, 4th Baronet (1907–1992)
Sir David Oliphant Kinloch, 5th Baronet (1942–2022)
Sir Alexander Peter Kinloch, 6th Baronet (born 1986)

The heir apparent is the present holder's son, Ivor Oliphant Kinloch (born 2020)

Notes

References
Kidd, Charles, Williamson, David (editors). Debrett's Peerage and Baronetage (1990 edition). New York: St Martin's Press, 1990, 

 The Scottish Nation, by William Anderson, Edinburgh, 1867, volume VI, p. 608.

Baronetcies in the Baronetage of Nova Scotia
Baronetcies in the Baronetage of the United Kingdom
1685 establishments in Nova Scotia
1873 establishments in the United Kingdom
Forfeited baronetcies